

Players

Competitions

Division Three

League table

Results summary

League position by match

Matches

Appearances and goals

References

Books

1976-77
Northampton Town